The 2014 Western Athletic Conference baseball tournament took place from May 21 to May 25.  The top six regular season finishers of the league's ten teams met in the double-elimination tournament held at Cubs Park, spring training home of the Chicago Cubs in Mesa, Arizona.  Sacramento State won the tournament for the first time, earning the Western Athletic Conference's automatic bid to the 2014 NCAA Division I baseball tournament.  No team currently in the league has won a WAC Tournament Championship.

Seeding and format
The top six finishers from the regular season will be seeded based on conference winning percentage.  Grand Canyon was ineligible as it completed the transition to Division I.

Bracket

All-Tournament Team
The following players were named to the All-Tournament Team. Sacramento State's Chris Lewis, one of four Hornets selected, was named Most Valuable Player.

References

Tournament
Western Athletic Conference Baseball Tournament